Goosebumps is an upcoming American horror comedy television series based on R. L. Stine's best-selling book series of the same name. Created by Rob Letterman and Nicholas Stoller, the series will be produced by Sony Pictures Television.

In 2020, a series based on the Goosebumps books was announced to be in development by Sony alongside Original Film and Scholastic Entertainment, all of whom previously developed two films based on the books. The first film's director Letterman was hired by 2022 to write the series alongside Stoller, with Letterman also helming the pilot.

Goosebumps is scheduled to be released on Disney+.

Synopsis
After accidentally releasing supernatural forces, five teenagers must find a way to work together and recapture them, while discovering their parents' secrets from their teenage years.

Cast
 Justin Long as Nathan Bratt
 Ana Yi Puig as Isabella
 Miles McKenna as James
 Will Price as Jeff
 Zack Morris as Isaiah
 Isa Briones as Margot
 Rachael Harris as Nora
 Rob Huebel as Colin

Production 

On April 28, 2020, it was announced that a reboot live action TV series was in the works by Scholastic Entertainment, Sony Pictures Television and Neal H. Moritz's production company Original Film who produced both the 2015 film and its sequel. In March 2021, R.L. Stine had stated that the series had found a producer and a director. On February 4, 2022, it was reported that Disney+ picked up the show, giving it a 10 episode order. Rob Letterman will return from the 2015 film (from Sony Pictures Animation) to direct the pilot, while he and Nicholas Stoller will write and executive-produce the series. 

In October, Justin Long, Ana Yi Puig, Miles McKenna, Will Price, Zack Morris, Isa Briones and Rachael Harris were cast to star in the series. In January 2023, Rob Huebel was added to the cast in a recurring guest star role.

Principal photography began in October 2022 in Vancouver, and is expected to end in March 2023.

References

External links

2020s American horror comedy television series
2020s American television series debuts
Goosebumps
Disney+ original programming
English-language television shows
Television shows based on American novels
Television shows filmed in Vancouver
Television series by Sony Pictures Television
Upcoming comedy television series